The 1960 Oklahoma State Cowboys football team represented Oklahoma State University–Stillwater during the 1960 NCAA University Division football season. The 1960 season was Oklahoma State's first as a member of the Big Eight Conference.  In their sixth season under head coach Cliff Speegle, the Cowboys compiled a 3–7 record (2–5 against conference opponents), tied for sixth place in the conference, and were outscored by opponents by a combined total of 126 to 102.

On offense, the 1960 team averaged 10.2 points scored, 186.2 rushing yards, and 26.0 passing yards per game.  On defense, the team allowed an average of 12.6 points scored, 196.4 rushing yards, and 64.0 passing yards per game The team's statistical leaders included Jim Dillard with 631 rushing yards and 20 points scored, Jim Elliott with 90 passing yards, and Tommy Jackson with 110 receiving yards.

Tackle Harold Beaty was selected as a first-team All-Big Eight Conference player.

The team played its home games at Lewis Field in Stillwater, Oklahoma.

Schedule

After the season

The 1961 NFL Draft was held on December 27–28, 1960. The following Cowboys were selected.

References

Oklahoma State
Oklahoma State Cowboys football seasons
Oklahoma State Cowboys football